"In for a Penny" is a song by the British rock band Slade, released in 1975 as the lead single from their sixth studio album Nobody's Fools. The song was written by lead vocalist Noddy Holder and bassist Jim Lea, and produced by Chas Chandler. It reached No. 11 in the UK, remaining in the charts for eight weeks.

Background
By 1975, Slade began to feel stale, believing they had achieved as much success in the UK and Europe as they could. The band and their manager Chas Chandler decided that their next career move should be to try and crack America. The band agreed to move to there and build a reputation for their live performances from scratch, just as they had in the UK. In between touring, the band recorded their next album, Nobody's Fools, which saw the band move towards a more "American" soul/pop sound in attempt to gain a commercial break on the American charts. "In for a Penny" was released as the lead single in November 1975, and reached No. 11 in the UK.

In a 1986 fan club interview, Hill spoke of the song in relation to it being released as the album's lead single: "When we came back from touring in the States and released that, I think a lot of fans were disappointed, though I personally liked the track. They thought we'd come back with something heavy, so it may have seemed lightweight to them." "In for a Penny" is notable for guitarist Dave Hill's guitar solo being his longest heard on a Slade single. Just before the second guitar solo in the track, Holder shouts the line "Ee, they got a band", which was a reference to a British TV advert in which a female character mistakes the entrance of threatening gangsters carrying violin cases for the arrival of a music combo.

Release
"In for a Penny" was released on 7" vinyl by Polydor Records in the UK, Ireland, Germany, France, Belgium, Sweden, the Netherlands, Spain, Portugal, Scandinavia, Yugoslavia, Australia and Japan. The B-side, "Can You Just Imagine", was exclusive to the single and would later appear on the band's 2007 compilation B-Sides.

Promotion
No music video was filmed to promote the single. In the UK, the band performed the song on the TV shows Top of the Pops and Supersonic. The song's performance on Top of the Pops has not surfaced since its original broadcast. In 1986, Lea recalled returning to Britain to perform the song on the show and the following day when the band watched their performance at Freddie Mercury's flat. On the same show, Queen appeared with "Bohemian Rhapsody" and Lea remembered being "totally knocked out" watching their video, while Mercury did not realise what an achievement his group had made.

Critical reception
Upon release, Record Mirror described the song as a "good Beatles-ish kind of tune" with "nice melodic guitar breaks and the harmonies are perhaps the best thing Slade have ever done". Melody Maker felt the song was "weakly constructed", commenting it was not "particularly ambitious" or "handled with great enthusiasm". In a retrospective review of Nobody's Fools, Classic Rock said the song, along with "Let's Call It Quits", are among the album's "most immediate moments".

Track listing
7" Single
"In For a Penny" - 3:34
"Can You Just Imagine" - 3:31

Chart performance

Personnel
Slade
Noddy Holder - lead vocals, guitar
Dave Hill - lead guitar, backing vocals
Jim Lea - bass, accordion, backing vocals
Don Powell - drums

Additional personnel
Chas Chandler - producer

References

1975 singles
1975 songs
Slade songs
Songs written by Noddy Holder
Songs written by Jim Lea
Song recordings produced by Chas Chandler
Polydor Records singles